Southern Highlands, an electoral district of the Legislative Assembly in the Australian state of New South Wales, was established in 1988. It was abolished in 2007 and largely replaced by Goulburn.


Election results

2003

Elections in the 1990s

1999

1996 by-election

1995

1991

Elections in the 1980s

1988

References

New South Wales state electoral results by district